Hongik-dong is a legal dong, neighbourhood of Seongdong-gu in Seoul, South Korea and governed by its administrative dong, Doseon-dong office.

See also 
Administrative divisions of South Korea

References

External links
 Seongdong-gu Official site in English
 Seongdong-gu Official website
 Map of Seongdong-gu
 Doseon-dong Resident office 

Neighbourhoods of Seongdong District